Tokashiki may refer to:

Tokashiki, Okinawa, an island located in Shimajiri district, Okinawa, Japan

People with the surname
, a member of the manga artist duo Adachitoka
, former WBA Light flyweight champion
, Japanese women's basketball player

Japanese-language surnames